HTX may refer to:

 Hashitoxicosis
 Heart transplantation
 Heat exchanger
 Hemitoxin
 Higher Technical Examination Programme of the Danish educational system
 Home Team Science and Technology Agency, a statutory board in the Singapore government focusing on science and technology in public security
 Homothorax
 Houston, Texas, United States
 Middle Hittite language, an extinct language of Anatolia
 ZIC3, a protein
 HyperTransport Expansion connector, part of the HyperTransport specification